Karoonda Highway is a  state-controlled highway in South Australia linking the Murray River towns of Murray Bridge and Loxton. It was created after local councils called for the renaming of the B55 road route.

Route
Karoonda Highway begins at Murray Bridge East. It heads north-east to the town of Karoonda, and from there, continues on to Alawoona. Thereafter it heads north to Kingston Road, where it turns east to Loxton, its north-eastern terminus. Bookpurnong Road continues on from Loxton, connecting the highway to Berri and the Sturt Highway.

History
In 2006, the local governments in the area, including Loxton Waikerie Council and Karoonda East Murray Council, called for the Loxton to Murray Bridge section of the B55 road route to be named Karoonda Highway, after the major town along the route. The B55 route actually extended past Loxton to Berri, which the councils initially didn't realise. By 2011, the route had been renamed Karoonda Highway from Loxton to Murray Bridge, and Bookpurnong Road north of Loxton to Berri.

In 2014, Karoonda Highway was rated as one of the worst roads in the states by South Australian motorists.

In the mid 2010s, the body of a little girl was found next to the highway and after a few months, authorities stated that the body was that of Khandalyce Pearce.

Major intersections

See also 

 List of road routes in South Australia

References 

Highways in South Australia